Pertusa may refer to :

 Pertusa (Africa), an Ancient North African city, former bishopric and present titular see in present Tunisia
 Pertusa (Spain), a Spanish municipality